A twin is one of two offspring produced in the same pregnancy.

Twin may also refer to:
 Twin, Alabama, a city in the United States
 Twin, Belgium, Walloon name of the Belgium city of Thuin
 Twin (production team), a Swedish record production and songwriting team
 Twin (TV series), a Norwegian television crime drama series from 2019
 Twin (windowing system), a windowing environment for text mode displays
 Twin pattern, software design pattern
 Willows TWIN, a Windows emulator
 Twin, a member of the Minnesota Twins baseball team
 Flat-twin engine
 V-twin engine
 Straight-twin engine, also referred to as a parallel-twin
 Crystal twin, a crystal sample with two domains containing a twin boundary
 Twin house, semi-detached housing
 Twin towns and sister cities, towns and cities involved in town twinning
 Gemini Twin, an American two-seat powered parachute design
 Air Creation Twin, a French two seat ultralight trike design

Surname
 Peter J. Twin (born 1937), English nuclear physicist

See also
 Twin paradox, a thought experiment
 Twin prime, a type of prime number
 Twin Range, a mountain range in the U.S. state of New Hampshire
Twinning (disambiguation)
 Twins (disambiguation)
The Twin (disambiguation)
 Twin Sisters (disambiguation)
 Gemini (disambiguation)